Chaplain (Brigadier General) Jerome A. Haberek, USA (born December 20, 1951) is a retired American Army officer who served as the 21st Deputy Chief of Chaplains of the United States Army from 2003 to 2005.

Awards and decorations

References

Further reading

United States Army generals
Recipients of the Legion of Merit
1951 births
Living people
Deputy Chiefs of Chaplains of the United States Army
Recipients of the Defense Superior Service Medal